Swifter Than Death (German: Schneller als der Tod, French: Face à la mort) is a 1925 French-Germany silent action film directed by Gérard Bourgeois and Harry Piel and starring Piel, Dary Holm, Denise Legeay and José Davert. It was shot at the Cité Elgé Studios in Paris and on location in Munich and the Côte d'Azur. The film's sets were designed by the art director Fritz Kraenke .

Cast
 Harry Piel as Harry Piel
 Denise Legeay as Lizzie
 José Davert as 	Jack Brown
 Fred Berger as 	Éric Holsen
 Dary Holm as 	Christensen
 Marguerite Madys as 	Yvette Riccoldi
 Paul Guidé as 	Le duc de Frontignac
 Albert Paulig as 	L'éditeur Riccoldi

References

Bibliography
 Elsaesser, Thomas & Wedel, Michael. The BFI companion to German cinema. British Film Institute, 1999.

External links 
 

1925 films
Films of the Weimar Republic
French silent feature films
1920s French films
German action films
French action films
1920s action films
German silent feature films
Films directed by Harry Piel
1920s German films
Gaumont Film Company films

de:Schneller als der Tod